β-Tocopherol (beta-tocopherol) is a type of tocopherol with formula C28H48O2.

References

Vitamin E
Chromanes